Prema Katha is a 1999 Indian Telugu-language romance drama film written by Vara Prasad Varma and directed by Ram Gopal Varma. It is the debut film of both Sumanth and Antara Mali as lead in Telugu film industry. The film opened to positive reviews by critics and but was commercially unsuccessful. It had a highly praised soundtrack including the hit song "Devudu Karunisthaadani". The film bagged six state Nandi Awards and was dubbed into Tamil as Kadhal Vanile.

Synopsis
Set in a rural backdrop, it is a love story between a poor village boy Suri (Sumanth) and a rich upper-class girl Divya, much to the opposition of the latter's violent brother.

Cast
 Sumanth as Suri
 Antara Mali as Divya
 Manoj Bajpayee as Sankaram
 Raadhika as Subhadra, Suri's mother
 Giri Babu as Janaki Ramaiah
 Annapoorna as Parvatiamma
 Narasimha Raju as Suri's father
 Khayyum as Suri's friend
 Tanish as Subba Rao

Soundtrack
The music was composed by Sandeep Chowta and released by Aditya Music. All lyrics were penned by Sirivennela Seetharama Sastry.

Awards
Nandi Awards - 1999
 Third Best Feature Film - Bronze - Nagarjuna
 Best Director - Ram Gopal Varma
 Best Supporting Actress - Raadhika 
 Best Male Dubbing Artist - P. Ravi Shankar 
 Best Cinematographer - Venkata Prasad
 Best Lyricist - Sirivennela Seetharama Sastry

References

External links

1999 films
1990s Telugu-language films
Films directed by Ram Gopal Varma
Films scored by Sandeep Chowta
1999 romantic drama films
Indian romantic drama films